Two ships in the United States Navy have been named USS General Greene for Nathanael Greene.

 was a revenue cutter built in 1791
 was a frigate built in 1799 and participated in the Quasi-War with France

Other ships are similarly named for Nathanael Greene:

, a James Madison-class fleet ballistic missile submarine
USAV MG Nathanael Greene (LT-801), a United States Army tugboat

United States Navy ship names